Philip Bliss (21 December 1787 – 18 November 1857) was a British book collector who served as Registrar of the University of Oxford from 1824 to 1853, and as Principal of St Mary Hall, Oxford, from 1848 until his death.

Life
Philip Bliss was born in Gloucestershire on 21 December 1787; his father (also called Philip) was rector of Dodington and Frampton Cotterel in the county. After studying at the grammar school in Chipping Sodbury and Merchant Taylors' School, London, Bliss moved to St John's College, Oxford, initially as a student and then as a Fellow from 1809. After ordination in 1818, he was appointed curate of Newington, Oxfordshire and later rector of Avening, Gloucestershire, but had little interest in parish work.  He wrote for various publications and produced reprints of historical works.  He worked at the Bodleian Library in Oxford from 1808 onward – he had had an interest in books and book collecting from childhood and accumulated a large collection, particularly relating to Oxford and poets of the 16th and 17th centuries – and began to publish his own works. He was also involved in the production of a new edition of Antony Wood's Athanae Oxonienses (1813 to 1820), although only the first volume of four was printed.

He spent some months in 1822, on the staff of the British Museum but returned to the Bodleian as junior sub-librarian at the prompting of his friend Bulkeley Bandinel (Bodley's Librarian 1813–1860), resigning in 1828 after his appointment in 1824 to the post of Registrar of the University of Oxford.  He resigned as registrar in April 1853, before the Oxford University Act 1854 was implemented, with a pension of £200. He was also Keeper of the Archives from 1826 ("a post in which his penchant for accumulation seems to have impeded administrative efficiency", says one writer) and principal of St Mary Hall from 1848 until his death in the principal's lodgings on 18 November 1857. After his death, his correspondence was purchased by the British Museum, and his books were sold for a total of £5,672 14s (about £ in modern money); the Bodleian acquired 745 of his books.  According to one writer, his "prominence and diligence in university business and his polished manners made him the embodiment of the traditions of ancien régime Oxford". One historian of the University of Oxford, Charles Mallet, wrote that Bliss had "mourned over the old traditions which were perishing. But he retained to the last a certain sweet, old-fashioned courtesy, and a punctual and orderly devotion to his duties, which had not always marked the older ways."

References

External links

1787 births
1857 deaths
English book and manuscript collectors
English librarians
Keepers of the Archives of the University of Oxford
People educated at Merchant Taylors' School, Northwood
Alumni of St John's College, Oxford
Fellows of St John's College, Oxford
Principals of St Mary Hall, Oxford
English bibliographers
Registrars of the University of Oxford